<noinclude>

Wales is currently divided into forty constituencies of the Parliament of the United Kingdom, which elect Members of Parliament to the House of Commons. After the General Election of December 2019, 22 of the Welsh constituencies are represented by Labour MPs, 14 by Conservative MPs, and 4 by Plaid Cymru MPs.

On 8 September 2021, the boundary commission for Wales published its proposals for the new constituencies of Wales, reducing the number from 40 to 32. As of September 2021, the same constituencies are used for elections to the Senedd, with the same boundaries used to make up the Senedd constituencies; however, proposed changes to Westminster constituencies are not automatically applied to Senedd ones, and there are proposals to increase the number of Senedd constituencies.

Constituencies

Proposed boundary changes

Failed sixth periodic review 
Under the terms of the Parliamentary Voting System and Constituencies Act 2011, the Sixth Periodic Review of Westminster Constituencies (the 2018 review) was based on reducing the total number of MPs from 650 to 600 and a strict electoral parity requirement that the electorate of all constituencies should be within a range of 5% either side of the electoral quota.

The Boundary Commission for Wales submitted their final proposals in respect of the Sixth Review in September 2018. Although the proposals were immediately laid before Parliament they were not brought forward by the Government for approval. Accordingly, they did not come into effect for the 2019 election which took place on 12 December 2019, and which was contested using the constituency boundaries in place since 2010.

On 24 March 2020, the Minister of State for the Cabinet Office, Chloe Smith, issued a written statement to Parliament setting out the Government's thinking with regard to parliamentary boundaries. Subsequently, the Parliamentary Constituencies Act 2020 was passed into law on 14 December 2020 which formally removed the duty to implement the 2018 review and set out the framework for future boundary reviews.

2023 periodic review 

The Parliamentary Constituencies Act 2020 was passed in December 2020, and the publication of the most recent data of electorate sizes of constituencies on 5 January 2021, lead the Boundary Commission for Wales to begin its review of the parliamentary constituencies in Wales. With the commission required to publish its final recommendations for boundary changes by 1 July 2023. By December 2021, the commission will publish the responses collected during the consultation period, and then conduct a six-week 'secondary consultation. Unlike the previous periodic review, the total UK constituencies was kept at 650.

When proportionally dividing the total 2021 electoral population of the United Kingdom using a statutory formula between the constituent countries of the UK, it results in England having 543 constituencies, Scotland having 57, Wales having 32 and Northern Ireland with the remaining 18. Each constituency recommended to have no more than 77,062 electors and no less than 69,724. The figure from Wales is calculated to be 8 seats lower from the total constituencies used for the 2019 UK general election when there were 40 constituencies, the largest decrease of any UK country or region. Wales has one 'protected constituency' not subject to UK electoral quotas, Ynys Môn on the Isle of Anglesey, where boundary changes are not applied. The decrease in constituencies in Wales has been described by the commission to represent "the most significant change to Wales’s constituencies in a century", and the commission has no control over the number of constituencies in Wales. The final proposal published by the commission will no longer require Parliamentary approval and the recommendations in the final report will be implemented automatically, however the second consultation period will allow public hearing about the proposals. The commission stated that it tried wherever possible to use existing local government boundaries, such as those of existing constituencies and principal areas.

Revised proposals 
On 19 October 2022, the Boundary Commission for Wales published its revised proposals for the new UK parliamentary constituencies in Wales. From publication following three periods of public consultation, there were comments due no later than 15 November. These are not the final constituencies to be used at the next UK general election, and marked on the table below. Final proposals will be published by 1 July 2023.

New – not existed prior, expanded – keeps name of and contains an entire former constituency, redefined – keeps name of and contains most of a former constituency.
{| class="wikitable collapsible collapsed" width="100%" style="text-align: center"
|+List of revised proposed constituencies (October 2022)
! rowspan="2" |Revised proposed constituency
! rowspan="2" |New electorate
! colspan="2" |Electoral wards from
! rowspan="2" |Status
! rowspan="2" |Notes
|-
!Constituency
!Principal area
|-
| rowspan="2" |Aberafan Porthcawl
| rowspan="2" |75,270
|Aberavon (part)
|Neath Port Talbot
| rowspan="2" |New constituency
| rowspan="2" |Proposed due to good transport and communication links
|-
|Bridgend (part)
|Bridgend
|-
| rowspan="3" |Alyn and Deeside
| rowspan="3" |75,695
|Alyn and Deeside (all)
|Flintshire
| rowspan="3" |Expanded constituency
| rowspan="3" |Proposed well connected by transport links and similar characteristics.
|-
|Clwyd South (part)
|Wrexham
|-
|Delyn (part)
|Flintshire
|-
| rowspan="3" |Bangor Aberconwy
| rowspan="3" |70,468
|Aberconwy (all)
|Conwy
| rowspan="3" |Expanded constituency
| rowspan="3" |Proposed well connected by transport links and similar characteristics.
|-
|Clwyd West (part)
|Conwy
|-
|Arfon (part)
|Gwynedd
|-
| rowspan="4" |Blaenau Gwent and Rhymney
| rowspan="4" |71,079
|Blaenau Gwent (all)
|Blaenau Gwent
| rowspan="4" |New constituency
| rowspan="4" |Proposed well connected by transport links and similar characteristics.
|-
|Merthyr Tydfil and Rhymney (part)
|Caerphilly
|-
|Islwyn (part)
|Caerphilly
|-
|Caerphilly (part)
|Caerphilly
|-
| rowspan="2" |Brecon, Radnor and Cwm-tawe
| rowspan="2" |72,113
|Brecon and Radnorshire (all)
|Powys
| rowspan="2" |New constituency
| rowspan="2" |Proposed due to similar characteristics, with Pontardawe sharing a semi-rural nature with Ystradgynlais, good road and communication links.
|-
|Neath (part)
|Neath Port Talbot
|-
| rowspan="2" |Bridgend
| rowspan="2" |76,464
|Bridgend (part)
|Bridgend
| rowspan="2" |Redefined constituency
| rowspan="2" |Proposed due to good transport links and entirely within Bridgend County Borough.
|-
|Ogmore (part)
|Bridgend
|-
| rowspan="2" |Carmarthen (Caerfyrddin)
| rowspan="2" |72,683
|Carmarthen East and Dinefwr (part)
|Carmarthenshire
| rowspan="2" |Expanded constituency
| rowspan="2" |Proposed due to it entirely within Carmarthenshire, and linguistic characteristics. Name restored; previously existed 1542–1997.
|-
|Carmarthen West and South Pembrokeshire (part)
|Carmarthenshire
|-
| Caerphilly
| 72,325
|Caerphilly (part)
|Caerphilly
| New constituency
| Proposed due to good transport and communication links. Originally proposed to combine parts of Caerphilly with most of Islwyn.
|-
| rowspan="2" |Cardiff East
| rowspan="2" |72,463
|Cardiff Central (all)
|Cardiff
| rowspan="2" |Expanded constituency
| rowspan="2" |Proposed due to good transport links, and entirely within the City and County of Cardiff. Name restored; previously existed 1918-1950.
|-
|Cardiff South and Penarth (part)
|Cardiff
|-
| rowspan="2" |Cardiff North
| rowspan="2" |71,143
|Cardiff North (all)
|Cardiff
| rowspan="2" |Expanded constituency
| rowspan="2" |Proposed due to good transport links such as the A470 and Manor Way.
|-
|Pontypridd (part)
|Rhondda Cynon Taf
|-
| rowspan="3" |Cardiff South and Penarth
| rowspan="3" |72,269
|Cardiff South and Penarth (part)
|Cardiff
| rowspan="3" |Redefined constituency
| rowspan="3" |Proposed due to road links.
|-
|Cardiff South and Penarth (part)
|Vale of Glamorgan
|-
|Vale of Glamorgan (part)
|Vale of Glamorgan
|-
| rowspan="2" |Cardiff West
| rowspan="2" |73,947
|Cardiff West (all)
|Cardiff
| rowspan="2" |Expanded constituency
| rowspan="2" |Proposed due to good transport links such as the M4 and Llantrisant Road.
|-
|Pontypridd (part)
|Rhondda Cynon Taf
|-
| rowspan="2" |Ceredigion Preseli
| rowspan="2" |74,063
|Ceredigion (all)
|Ceredigion
| rowspan="2" |New constituency
| rowspan="2" |Proposed due to similar characteristics including a rural and coastal nature, and good road links such as the A487.
|-
|Preseli Pembrokeshire (part)
|Pembrokeshire
|-
| rowspan="3" |Clwyd East
| rowspan="3" |76,395
|Vale of Clwyd (part)
|Denbighshire
| rowspan="3" |New constituency
| rowspan="3" |Proposed due to good transport and communication links. Denbighshire principal area could've been a constituency on its own, however such a proposal impacted the ability to create other constituencies in North Wales, therefore was not considered.
|-
|Clwyd West (part)
|Denbighshire
|-
|Delyn (part)
|Flintshire
|-
| rowspan="3" |Clwyd North
| rowspan="3" |76,150
|Vale of Clwyd (part)
|Denbighshire
| rowspan="3" |New constituency
| rowspan="3" |Proposed due to good transport and communication links.
|-
|Clwyd West (part)
|Denbighshire
|-
|Clwyd West (part)
|Conwy
|-
| rowspan="2" |Dwyfor Meirionnydd
| rowspan="2" |69,803
|Dwyfor Meirionnydd (all)
|Gwynedd
| rowspan="2" |Expanded constituency
| rowspan="2" |Proposed due to similarities in nature and character, in addition to good transport and communication links.
|-
|Arfon (part)
|Gwynedd
|-
| rowspan="2" |Gower and Swansea West
| rowspan="2" |75,214
|Swansea West (part)
|Swansea
| rowspan="2" |New constituency
| rowspan="2" |Proposed due to containing all electoral wards on the Gower Peninsula, all contained within the City and County of Swansea, and good transport and communication links.
|-
|Gower (part)
|Swansea
|-
| rowspan="2" |Llanelli
| rowspan="2" |68,895
|Llanelli (all)
|Carmarthenshire
| rowspan="2" |Expanded constituency
| rowspan="2" |Proposed due to good transport and communication links.
|-
|Carmarthen East and Dinefwr (part)
|Carmarthenshire
|-
| rowspan="3" |Merthyr Tydfil and Upper Cynon
| rowspan="3" |74,805
|Merthyr Tydfil and Rhymney (part)
|Merthyr Tydfil (all)
| rowspan="3" |New constituency
| rowspan="3" |Recognised to not follow the geography of the valleys, however Proposed due to good road links across the Heads of the Valleys.
|-
|Cynon Valley (part)
|Rhondda Cynon Taf
|-
|Caerphilly (part)
|Caerphilly
|-
| rowspan="2" |Mid and South Pembrokeshire
| rowspan="2" |76,820
|Preseli Pembrokeshire (part)
|Pembrokeshire
| rowspan="2" |New constituency
| rowspan="2" |Proposed due to entirely being within the Pembrokeshire principal area.
|-
|Carmarthen West and South Pembrokeshire (part)
|Pembrokeshire
|-
| rowspan="2" |Monmouthshire
| rowspan="2" |72,681
|Monmouth (part)
|Monmouthshire (all)
| rowspan="2" |Expanded constituency
| rowspan="2" |Proposed to have the entire Monmouthshire principal area as one constituency. Name restored; previously existed 1536–1885.
|-
|Newport East (part)
|Monmouthshire (all)
|-
| rowspan="3" |Montgomeryshire and Glyndŵr
| rowspan="3" |76,953
|Montgomeryshire (all)
|Powys
| rowspan="3" |New constituency
| rowspan="3" |Proposed due to similar in nature, and share similar rural characteristics.
|-
|Clwyd South (part)
|Wrexham
|-
|Clwyd South (part)
|Denbighshire
|-
| rowspan="4" |Neath and Swansea East
| rowspan="4" |72,172
|Neath (part)
|Neath Port Talbot
| rowspan="4" |New constituency
| rowspan="4" |Proposed due to similar characteristics as mixed-rural areas with good transport links.
|-
|Gower (part)
|Swansea
|-
|Aberavon (part)
|Neath Port Talbot
|-
|Swansea East (part)
|Swansea
|-
| rowspan="2" |Newport East
| rowspan="2" |76,159
|Newport East (part)
|Newport
| rowspan="2" |Redefined constituency
| rowspan="2" |Proposed due to entirely being within the City of Newport.
|-
|Newport West (part)
|Newport
|-
| rowspan="2" |Newport West and Islwyn
| rowspan="2" |76,367
|Newport West (part)
|Newport
| rowspan="2" |New constituency
| rowspan="2" |Proposed due to local ties, and good transport and communication links. Originally proposed to combine parts of Caerphilly with most of Islwyn.
|-
|Islwyn (part)
|Caerphilly
|-
| rowspan="2" |Pontypridd
| rowspan="2" |73,743
|Pontypridd (part)
|Rhondda Cynon Taf
| rowspan="2" |Redefined constituency
| rowspan="2" |Proposed due to entirely being within Rhondda Cynon Taf County Borough, and follows valley roads from north to south.
|-
|Cynon Valley (part)
|Rhondda Cynon Taf
|-
| rowspan="3" |Rhondda
| rowspan="3" |69,764
|Rhondda (all)
|Rhondda Cynon Taf
| rowspan="3" |Expanded constituency
| rowspan="3" |Proposed due to entirely being within Rhondda Cynon Taf County Borough, and good valley road links from north to south, to retain the local identity.
|-
|Ogmore (part)
|Rhondda Cynon Taf
|-
|Pontypridd (part)
|Rhondda Cynon Taf
|-
| rowspan="3" |Swansea Central and North
| rowspan="3" |71,378
|Gower (part)
|Swansea
| rowspan="3" |New constituency
| rowspan="3" |Proposed due to entirely being within the City and County of Swansea, and good transport and communication links.
|-
|Swansea East (part)
|Swansea
|-
|Swansea West (part)
|Swansea
|-
| rowspan="2" |Torfaen
| rowspan="2" |70,591
|Torfaen (all)
|Torfaen (all)
| rowspan="2" |Expanded constituency
| rowspan="2" |Proposed to have the entire Torfaen County Borough as one constituency.
|-
|Monmouth (part)
|Torfaen (all)
|-
|Vale of Glamorgan
|70,426
|Vale of Glamorgan (part)
|Vale of Glamorgan
|Redefined constituency
|Proposed due to containing all but one of the electoral wards of the existing constituency of the same name, all contained within Vale of Glamorgan County Borough, with the exception of Dinas Powys.
|-
| rowspan="2" |Wrexham
| rowspan="2" |70,964
|Wrexham (all)
|Wrexham
| rowspan="2" |Expanded constituency
| rowspan="2" |Proposed due to entirely being within Wrexham County Borough, similar in nature, and with good transport and communication links.
|-
|Clwyd South (part)
|Wrexham
|-
|Ynys Môn
|52,415
|Ynys Môn (all)
|Isle of Anglesey (all)
|Protected constituency
|Constituency not subject to the statutory UK electoral quota.
|}

Results history
Primary data source: House of Commons research briefing – General election results from 1918 to 2019

2019 
The number of votes cast for each political party who fielded candidates in constituencies comprising Wales in the 2019 general election were as follows:

Percentage votes 

Key:

CON – Conservative Party, including National Liberal Party up to 1966

LAB – Labour Party

LIB – Liberal Party up to 1979; SDP-Liberal Alliance 1983 & 1987; Liberal Democrats from 1992

PC – Plaid Cymru

UKIP/Br – UK Independence Party 2010 to 2017 (included in Other up to 2005 and in 2019); Brexit Party in 2019

Green – Green Party of England and Wales (included in Other up to 2005)

Seats 

CON – Conservative Party, including National Liberal Party up to 1966

LAB – Labour Party

LIB – Liberal Party up to 1979; SDP-Liberal Alliance 1983 & 1987; Liberal Democrats from 1992

OTH – 1970 – Independent (S. O. Davies); 2005 – Independent (Peter Law)

PC – Plaid Cymru

Maps 

These are maps of the results of the last four general elections in Wales and changes in 2019 following a by-election and a change of affiliation.

 Red represents the Labour Party's MPs.
 Blue represents the Conservative Party's MPs.
 Amber represents the Liberal Democrats' MPs.
 Green represents Plaid Cymru's MPs.
 Grey represents Independent MPs.

2019 by-elections 
*Two by-elections were held in 2019:

 2019 Newport West by-election
 2019 Brecon and Radnorshire by-election

See also
 List of parliamentary constituencies in Clwyd
 List of parliamentary constituencies in Dyfed
 List of parliamentary constituencies in Gwent
 List of parliamentary constituencies in Gwynedd
 List of parliamentary constituencies in Mid Glamorgan
 List of parliamentary constituencies in Powys
 List of parliamentary constituencies in South Glamorgan
 List of parliamentary constituencies in West Glamorgan
 Senedd constituencies and electoral regions

References

Lists of constituencies of the Parliament of the United Kingdom in Wales
Parliamentary